The 1924 Maine gubernatorial election took place on September 8, 1924.

Incumbent Governor Percival P. Baxter did not seek re-election. Republican candidate Ralph Owen Brewster defeated Democratic candidate William Robinson Pattangall. Frank G. Farrington unsuccessfully ran for the Republican nomination.

Results

Notes

References

Gubernatorial
1924
Maine
September 1924 events